is an English contract law case, concerning the extent to which damages may be sought for failure to perform of a contract when a sum is fixed in a contract. It held that only if a sum is of an unconscionable amount will it be considered penal and unenforceable. The legal standing of this case has been superseded by the Supreme Court's 2015 ruling in the combined cases of Cavendish Square Holding BV v Talal El Makdessi and ParkingEye Ltd v Beavis.

The case should not be confused with Dunlop Pneumatic Tyre Co Ltd v Selfridge & Co Ltd, which held that the same resale price maintenance practice was unenforceable against a third party reseller as a matter of the English rule of privity of contract.

Facts
Dunlop sued its tyre retailer, New Garage, for breaching an agreement to not resell Dunlop tyres at a price lower than that listed in the contract. The agreement then said if that did happen, New Garage would pay £5 per tyre ‘by way of liquidated damages and not as a penalty’.

The judge held the £5 sum was liquidated damages and enforceable. The Court of Appeal held the clause was a penalty and Dunlop could only obtain nominal damages. Dunlop appealed.

Judgment
The House of Lords held the clause was not a penalty, and merely a genuine pre-estimate of Dunlop’s potential loss, and so Dunlop could enforce the agreement. Lord Dunedin set out the following principles.

Legal overhaul
The "leading case" status of this ruling was superseded by the Supreme Court of the United Kingdom in a 2015 ruling in the combined cases of Cavendish Square Holding BV v Talal El Makdessi and ParkingEye Ltd v Beavis. These appeals, which raised similar legal issues, gave the Supreme Court an opportunity to review the law on penalties based on Dunlop. Lord Neuberger PSC observed at the commencement of his joint judgment with Lord Sumption JSC:

See also

Penalty clause
Cavendish Square Holdings BV v Makdessi
Unfair Terms in Consumer Contracts Regulations 1999

References

English contract case law
House of Lords cases
1914 in case law
1914 in British law
Goodyear Tire and Rubber Company